Afakriya Aduwa Gadzama mni OFR (22 November 1953) is a Nigerian security officer who is the Chairman of the National Institute for Policy and Strategic Studies. He previously served as Director General of the State Security Service (SSS) under President Umaru Yar'Adua from August 2007 to September 2010.

Background and education
Afakriya Aduwa Gadzama was born on 22 November 1953 at Lassa in Askira/Uba Local Government Area of Borno State Nigeria. He attended the prestigious Barewa College, Zaria from (1968–1972), then School of Basic studies Zaria Kaduna State. He later proceeded to the Ahmadu Bello University Zaria, where he obtained his bachelor's degree (BA) in Political Science (1977). In 2001, Gadzama attended the Senior Executive Course at the National Institute for Policy and Strategic Studies (NIPSS)  Kuru, Jos.

Early career
Gadzama started his career in 1978 with the Ministry of Finance in Borno State and transferred to the National Security Organization as a Principal Officer in 1984. He rose through the ranks of the NSO and the subsequent State Security Service which was carved out of the NSO when it was dissolved.

State Security Service 
His postings at the State Security Service include:

Director of Security, Plateau State (1989–1991)
Director of Security, Federal Capital Territory (1991–1993)
Director of Security, Kaduna (1993–1997)
Director of Operations, SSS National Headquarters (1997–1998)
Director of Programmes, SSS National Headquarters 1999
Director of Intelligence (2001–2002)
Director of Operations (2002–2003)
Director of Administration and Logistics, National Headquarters (2004–2005)
Director of  Corporate Services, National Headquarters (2006–2007).

In August 2007, President Umaru Yar'Adua appointed Gadzama as Director General of the State Security Service. Gadzama was instrumental in President Umaru Yar Adua's Niger Delta Amnesty Program. In September 2010, Ita Ekpeyong replaced Gadzama as Director General of the SSS after President Goodluck Jonathan's mass dismissal of security chiefs.

Later career 
On December 16, 2019, Nigeria's President Muhammadu Buhari appointed Gadzama as the Chairman of the National Institute Security Studies.

References

Living people
1953 births
People from Borno State
Ahmadu Bello University alumni
Barewa College alumni
Directors General of the State Security Service (Nigeria)
Nigerian security personnel
National Security Organization staff
Members of the Nigerian National Institute of Policy and Strategic Studies
Marghi people